Nexosa marmarastra is a species of moth of the  family Tortricidae. It is found on Java.

References

Moths described in 1932
Nexosa